The Selle (also spelt Celle in the Oise) is a river of Hauts-de-France, France. Rising at Catheux, just north of Crèvecœur-le-Grand, Oise, it flows past Conty, Saleux, Salouël and Pont-de-Metz before joining the Somme at Amiens.

In many places along its course, the river widens to form or fill lakes, much appreciated by anglers and gravel extractors. Several water-powered mills can still be seen including a paper-mill at Prouzel. Brown trout thrive in the clear waters of the river.

References

External links

 Page about the Selle on the website of the Canton de Conty 
 Banque Hydro - Station E6426010 - La Selle à Plachy-Buyon (option Synthèse) 

Rivers of France
Rivers of Oise
Rivers of Somme (department)
Rivers of Hauts-de-France